Dengzhou (邓州) is a county-level city in Henan, China.

Dengzhou may also refer to:
Dengzhou, a former name of Penglai in Shandong, China
 Deng Prefecture (登州), a prefecture between the 6th and 14th centuries around modern Penglai, Shandong, China
 Dengzhou Subdistrict (登州街道), a subdistrict of Penglai, Shandong, China
Deng Prefecture (鄧州), a prefecture between the 6th and 20th centuries in modern Henan, China

See also
Deng (disambiguation)